Aikenhead is a Scots language surname of medieval Scottish origin.  Its oldest public record dates to 1372, when Robert II granted the lands of "Akynheuide" in Lanark to John de Maxwell, and in the same year, Convallus de Akinhead was recorded as witness to another land grant.

Notable people with the surname Aikenhead include:

 Arlene Aikenhead, Canadian Paralympic equestrian
 Mary Aikenhead (1787–1858), Roman Catholic nun
 Thomas Aikenhead (1676–1697), executed for blasphemy
 William Aikenhead (1842–1902), Member of Tasmanian House of Assembly

See also
 Aitkenhead, surname

External links
 Coat of arms
 Aikenhead surname

Scottish surnames
Surnames of Lowland Scottish origin
Toponymic surnames